The third FAI World Grand Prix 2008–2009 was a gliding Grand Prix that took place in 2010 in Santiago, Chile, with qualifying races taking place during the 2008–2009 flying season, worldwide.

Summary

Overall results

Qualifying races

Final
The list of participating pilots:

Race 1 – 2.01.2010

Race 2 – 3.01.2010

Race 3 – 4.01.2010

Race 4 – 5.01.2010

Race 5 – 6.01.2010

Race 6 – 7.01.2010

Race 7 – 8.01.2010

Race 8 – 9.01.2010

External links 
 https://web.archive.org/web/20080511231854/http://www.fai.org/gliding/QSGP0809
 http://events.fai.org/event?i=6081&f=30
 http://www.grandprixchile.org/

Gliding competitions
2008 in air sports
2008 in Chilean sport
Gliding in Chile
International sports competitions hosted by Chile
Aviation history of Chile